Francisco Tomás Morales (Agüimes Carrizal, Canary Islands, December 20, 1781 or 1783 – Las Palmas, Canary Islands, October 5, 1845), was a Spanish military, and the last of that country to hold the post of Captain General of Venezuela, reaching the rank of field marshal during the Venezuelan War of Independence.

As recounted in a series of letters distributed by the Philadelphia Gazette, in 1822 General Morales issued a decree widely interpreted by the American merchants then in Caracas, La Guaira, and Puerto Cabello as a threat.  The Americans solicited the help of Captain Robert T. Spence, whose frigate, the Cyane, was in the area, to delay his departure for Africa (on piracy duty) to protect them from Morales. Spence complied for several days in October 1822, much to the relief of the Americans, at least briefly.

Morales conceded defeat after the Battle of Lake Maracaibo in July 1823.
Puerto Cabello, the last Royalist stronghold in Venezuela, fell to the independentist forces in November 1823.

Battles and campaigns

References 

1780s births
1845 deaths

Spanish generals
Captains General of Venezuela